Flandria Illustrata is a historiographical and topographical work from 1641 by the Flemish canon Antonius Sanderus. It contains historical descriptions of the main towns and villages of the former County of Flanders, in addition to the lives of its counts and bishops. The works is lavishly illustrated. It contains etched portraits of historical figures and heraldic representations but it is specifically known for its maps and topographical views which form an important source for historic study. The Latin work knew several editions and translations until well into the 18th century. In Dutch it was published under the title Verheerlykt Vlaandre (Glorify Flanders).

Sanderus' predecessors 
Sanderus tells us in his Sanderus Apologidion that the biggest inspiration for his Flandria Illustrata was the Theatrum sive Hollandiae Comitatus et urbium nova descriptio Marcus Zuerius Boxhornius (Boxhorn Nl), which in 1632 was published by the Amsterdam based publisher and engraver Henricus Hondius. It was Sanderus' goal to surpass his predecessors, both in terms of completeness and quality.

Illustrations 
As the title Flandria Illustrata underlines it is more lavishly illustrated than its earlier Dutch example.
Apart from city maps in cavalier projection, major civil and ecclesiastic buildings and structures such as town halls, guild houses, fortifications, churches and convents are represented, mostly in bird's eye view. Rural places are often represented with a view of the local castle or country house, underscoring the feodal structure of the county. Many illustrations have been provided by the artist and surveyor Vedastus Du Plouich. City maps of larger cities such as Brugge and Ghent however are based on older published sources such as Braun and Hogenberg's 'Civitates Orbis Terrarum'. In the case of the map of Ghent for example the map is oriented in a different direction and the representation of some streets and fortifications is updated.

Publication 
The writing and publishing of Flandria Illustrata did not run without a hitch. After the plan was conceived, Sanderus contacted the publisher Henricus Hondius, who had published the work of Boxhorn. The contact went through an intermediary named Johannes D'Hondt, a nephew of the publisher and an acquaintance of Sanderus. There was one major problem: Hondius, based in a Calvinist Republic, was a Protestant. This would mean that the book would be difficult to obtain in Catholic Flanders, but it would also put Sanderus, a canon, in a bad light. Protestant publishers had already found a solution to this problem: the book was printed and published in the Protestant Republic, but under the name of a Catholic publisher from Cologne.

From 1632 Sanderus began with the first studies for his work. In 1634 he signed a contract with Hondius. After some time tensions arose: Hondius had begun the work with the material he already received, but had to interrupt the production process repeatedly because of articles and drawings that were still lacking. Hondius himself remained not free from blame: he sent back several drawings and maps for (unnecessary) corrections while failing to implement the corrections that Sanderus suggested. Hondius was so thoroughly tired of the situation that he sold the Flandria Illustrata to its competitor brothers Blaeu without even notifying Sanderus nor Johannes D'Hondt. Meanwhile the publication already advanced fairly well. Although the publication was initially planned for Easter 1637, it would take almost four more years until the first volume appeared on April the first 1641.

Third volume 
Sanderus also prepared a third volume containing a description of French Flanders, Tournai and the Tournaisis that was titled; Icones Urbium, Villarum, Castellorum et Coenobiorum Gallo-Flandriae, quae Tertia Pars est Flandriae illustratae. Although it was already prepared in detail, including the preparatory drawings for the maps and illustrations by Vedastus du Plouich , this volume was never published. The drawings by du Plouich survived and are kept in the manuscript department of the Royal Library of Belgium.

Notes

References 
Caullet, G., De gegraveerde, onuitgegeven en verloren geraakte teekeningen voor Sanderus’ Flandria Illustrata, Antwerpen, 1908
De Borchgrave, O., 'Henricus Hondius en de eerste uitgave van Sanderus’ Flandria illustrata', Handelingen van de Koninklijke Geschied- en Oudheidkundige kring van Kortrijk, jrg. x (1979), nr. 96, pp. 95-113
De Vleesschauwer, C., De Flandria illustrata van Antonius Sanderus: alfabetisch register van het illustratiemateriaal in de twee Latijnse edities (1641, 1732) en in Verheerlijkt Vlaandre (1735), Brussels, 1978
Fris, V., 'Sanderus', Biographie Nationale, XXI, Brussels, 1913, pp. 317-367
Galesloot, L., La Flandria illustrata de Sanderus. Première édition. Notice historique sur sa publication, Bruges, 1873
Van Overschelde, A.D., Leven en werken van kanunnik Antoon Sanders die zich Sanderus noemde (De Vlaamse toeristische bibliotheek. Deel 27), Antwerpen, 1964.
Viaene, A., 'Van Flandria Illustrata naar Verheerlijkt Vlaandre. Bibliografische kanttekeningen op Sanderus, 1641-1735', Biekorf, jrg. 70 (1970), pp. 193-204

External links

 Flandria illustrata, online at Ghent University Library
 Flandria Illustrata at KBR
 Illustrations for the unpublished third volume of Flandria Illustrata at KBR

History books about Belgium
History of Flanders
1641 books